As of 2022, Jiangsu hosts 168 institutions of higher education, ranking first of all Chinese provinces. There are two Project 985, 11 Project 211, and 16 Double First Class universities in the province.

References

List of Chinese Colleges and Universities in 2014 — Ministry of Education
List of Chinese universities, including official links
Jiangsu Institutions Admitting International Students

 
Jiangsu